Caroline Smith and the Good Night Sleeps is an indie folk band from Minneapolis, Minnesota fronted by singer and primary songwriter Caroline Smith.

History 
Caroline Smith is originally from Detroit Lakes, Minnesota, a town of about 8,600 according to the 2010 Census. She began playing music at an early age, reportedly learning guitar from her father.  At 16 she started performing publicly at Zorbaz Pizza in her hometown and opened for B.B. King as well as releasing a self-titled album. Caroline has been quoted saying she prefers the guitar, more than other instruments, because of her ability to control the dynamics. She describes her voice as a "conglomerate" with countless influences ranging from Billie Holiday to Peter, Paul and Mary among others.

In 2006, at 18 she moved to Minneapolis to study at the University of Minnesota.  She quickly began a weekly solo gig at Minneapolis' West Bank 400 Bar, a venue famous for acts such as Elliott Smith, Conor Oberst and Mason Jennings. In 2007, the club's owner, Tom Sullivan, introduced her to drummer Arlen Peiffer who is known for his work in the band Cloud Cult.  A year later, bassist Jesse Schuster joined the band.  Then in March 2011, Caroline joined forces with multi-instrumentalist Alex Ramsey expanding into the Good Night Sleeps.

Career 
In August 2008, the band released their debut full-length album Backyard Tent Set. The album was recorded at Devil's Workshop in Minneapolis with Chad Weis (Mason Jennings, Ben Kweller).  The sound is described by Smith as "storybook folk with an indie twist. We think it's important that our recording sounds like our live show." The band has toured twice in support of the album, playing as many dates as possible including an open mic at the Shadow Lounge in Pittsburgh.   

In 2010,  Smith and bandmate Jesse Schuster released Live at the Cedar, recorded exclusively during a show at the Cedar Cultural Center. The album included several songs from Backyard Tentset as well as five additions.  The albums were hand packaged and fitted with an envelope, string and a wax stamp and sold out within 6 months.

The band completed seven national tours and has played at venues including Minneapolis' notable First Avenue.  Smith described the experience of selling out the hometown venue:  "When I was in high school, I used to sit in my bathroom and sing with my guitar and pretend I was on the main stage of First Avenue...I was totally transported back to that moment as soon as I started playing and I got all giddy."

On March 6, 2011, Minnesota Public Radio station  89.3 The Current premiered a new song from the band on The Local Show entitled "Tank Top."  Previously, Smith, along with bandmate Jesse Schuster, performed "She Ain't Got it," "Lack of Height," "Denim Boy" and "Tying My Shoes" in the 89.3 The Current studios which was filmed on February 2, 2010.

The band recorded their last album to date, Little Wind, at the Terrarium in Minneapolis with Jason Orris (Polara, Happy Apple, Haley Bonar). The record, mixed by Tom Herbers (Low, Dark Dark Dark, Andrew Bird), was released on September 20, 2011. She describes the new record as an "evolving more rocking sound still with folk elements and roots, We like to say post folk."

Half About Being A Woman, released as a solo album, had a more neo-soul feel and drew influences from artists of "the 90’s neo-soul explosion" such as Erykah Badu, Jill Scott and D’Angelo. She spoke about it at the time, saying "I’m glad we gave ourselves a chance to write the music we really love."

Your Smith 
In 2018, after moving to Los Angeles, Caroline Smith signed to Neon Gold Records under the name Your Smith and released the EP Bad Habit. In November 2021, Your Smith was featured on the single "Heavy" by Australian electronic duo Flight Facilities.

Discography

Albums
Backyard Tent Set (August 19, 2008)
Live at the Cedar (Caroline Smith Feat. Jesse Schuster) (January 28, 2010) 
Little Wind (September 20, 2011) 
Half About Being a Woman (October 8, 2013)

References

External links
 Featured on the PBS program MN Original from the TPT St. Paul, MN Station: MN Original Videos

2006 establishments in Minnesota
Indie rock musical groups from Minnesota
Musical quartets
Musical groups established in 2006